Cissampelos is a genus of flowering plants in the family Menispermaceae. Various species of this genus have a history of use in various traditions of herbal medicine. Moreover, many of these plants were used as curare applied as arrow poison during hunting.

Cissampelos pareira is used in Chinese herbology, where it is called xí shēng téng (锡生藤) or yà hū nú (亞乎奴). The species is also known as abuta and is also called laghu patha in Ayurvedic medicine.

The Maasai people of Kenya use Cissampelos mucronata as a forage for their cattle.

Selected species
21 accepted species + 1 newly discovered species
 Cissampelos andromorpha DC.
 Cissampelos arenicola Ortiz RdC, MH Nee. 2014 New species
 Cissampelos capensis L.f.	
 Cissampelos fasciculata Benth.
 Cissampelos friesiorum Diels
 Cissampelos glaberrima A.St.-Hil.
 Cissampelos grandifolia Triana & Planch.
 Cissampelos hirta Klotzsch
 Cissampelos hispida Forman
 Cissampelos laxiflora Moldenke
 Cissampelos mucronata A.Rich.
 Cissampelos nepalensis Rhodes
 Cissampelos nigrescens Diels
 Cissampelos ovalifolia DC.
 Cissampelos owariensis P.Beauv. ex DC.	
 Cissampelos pareira L.
 Cissampelos rigidifolia (Engl.) Diels	
 Cissampelos sympodialis Eichler
 Cissampelos tenuipes Engl.
 Cissampelos torulosa E.Mey. ex Harv. & Sond.
 Cissampelos tropaeolifolia DC.
 Cissampelos verticillata Rhodes

References

External links

https://web.archive.org/web/20131105201226/http://www.africamuseum.be/prelude/prelude_pic/Cissampelos_mucronata2.jpg - plant image

Menispermaceae
Menispermaceae genera
Plants used in Ayurveda
Plants used in traditional Chinese medicine